Thièvres is the name of two communes in France:
 Thièvres, Pas-de-Calais
 Thièvres, Somme

oc:Thièvres